Roopesh Peethambaran is an Indian film director and actor working in Malayalam cinema. As an actor, he first appeared as a child artist in the 1995 film Spadikam (as Thomas Chacko). In 2012, he made his directorial debut through Theevram.

Film career
Roopesh Peethambaran started his film career in 1995 as a child artist in Spadikam. He played the childhood role of Thomas Chacko which was portrayed by Mohanlal. He also acted as child artist in the 1996 television series Pranavam aired on Doordarshan Malayalam. As an adult, Roopesh worked as an IT professional in Dell, Bangalore, before quitting to pursue his love for film. He made his directorial debut with the Malayalam film Theevram in 2012.

Filmography as director

Filmography as actor

TV serials

Feature films

Short films

References

Malayalam film directors
Malayali people
Living people
People from Ernakulam district
Film directors from Kerala
Malayalam screenwriters
Screenwriters from Kerala
Year of birth missing (living people)